Potiphar's Wife is a 1931 British romance film directed by Maurice Elvey and starring Nora Swinburne, Laurence Olivier and Guy Newall. It is also known as Her Strange Desire. It was based on a play by Edgar C. Middleton.

It was made at Elstree Studios. The film's sets were designed by Clarence Elder.

Cast
 Nora Swinburne as Lady Diana Bromford 
 Laurence Olivier as Straker 
 Norman McKinnel as Lord Bromford 
 Guy Newall as Maurice Worthington 
 Donald Calthrop as Counsel for Defense 
 Ronald Frankau as Major Tony Barlow 
 Betty Schuster as Rosita Worthington 
 Marjorie Brooks as Sylvia Barlow 
 Walter Armitage as Geoffrey Hayes 
 Henry Wenman as Stevens 
 Gibb McLaughlin as Chauffeur  
 Elsa Lanchester as Therese 
 Henry Vibart as Judge

See also
 Potiphar's wife

References

Bibliography
 Low, Rachael. Filmmaking in 1930s Britain. George Allen & Unwin, 1985.
 Wood, Linda. British Films, 1927-1939. British Film Institute, 1986.

External links

1931 films
1930s romance films
Films shot at British International Pictures Studios
1930s English-language films
Films directed by Maurice Elvey
Films set in England
British black-and-white films
British romance films
1930s British films